State Road 777 (SR 777) is an  state road near North Port, Florida, United States. SR 777 is locally known as River Road from Interstate 75 (I-75) south to its southern terminus at Tamiami Trail (US Highway 41, US 41) where it continues south as a county road.

Route description
SR 777 begins at an intersection with US 41. Upon crossing US 41, the road is a six-lane divided highway. The road passes through some homes and narrows to a two-lane undivided highway before approaching Blue Heron Park and intersecting West Villages Parkway. The state road heads northwest through some developments, crossing Center Road, Jelks Preserve, and Venice Avenue. After crossing Venice Avenue, it becomes a four-lane divided highway. SR 777 reaches its northern terminus at the interchange with I-75. The road's end of pavement is just north of the interchange, south of Curry Creek.

History
The road has been shown on Florida’s official transportation maps (formerly known as road maps) as far back as 1917. On the 1917 State Road Department (SRD) Map, the state road spanned Englewood to present-day North Port. The road was a portion of “Road Number 12” as designated by the State Road Department, a precursor to Florida Department of Transportation (FDOT). The road was then known as SR 311, spanning from Venice to Englewood, as a loop of US 41 before it was renumbered in 1945. After the 1945 renumbering, the state road spanned from Englewood to North Port, from SR 775 to US 41, with its alignment north of US 41 parallel to the Myakka River. The portion north of US 41 was transferred to the county sometime in the 1950s. The southern portion from US 41 to SR 775 was transferred to the county sometime between 1978 and 1979. 

In 2018, Sarasota County accepted the state’s $40 million offer to swap responsibility for several roads (i.e. road swap) in exchange for the state to perform major improvements on River Road, one of the county’s main thoroughfares and vital evacuation routes. FDOT handed over the responsibility of a portion of SR 758, known locally as Siesta Drive and Midnight Pass Road, west of US 41. The county will be responsible for ongoing maintenance of those roadways, although the state would still maintain the bridges to Siesta Key. The road transfer was completed in September 2020.

Major intersections

References

External links

777
777
North Port, Florida